The Look of Love: Burt Bacharach Songbook is an album by Trijntje Oosterhuis and Metropole Orchestra, released on 20 November 2006. This album is the fourth album for Trijntje Oosterhuis, and was released in Japan on 17 January 2007 under the artist name Traincha with a bonus song "Anyone Who Had a Heart (live)". The album consists of Burt Bacharach covers.

The Metropole Orchestra was conducted by Vince Mendoza, who gained notoriety for arranging the Grammy winning album Both Sides Now by Joni Mitchell. The album was mixed by Al Schmitt.

The album was certified Platinum on the day of release for having shipped more than 70,000 copies  and debuted at No. 1 on the Dutch album chart for two weeks. Oosterhuis performed a Christmas tour with the Metropole Orchestra from 6 December 2006 onwards to promote the album.

Track listing

Credits
 Trijntje Oosterhuis
 Metropole Orkest
 Burt Bacharach – piano
 Rob Shrock – piano
 Hans Vroomans – piano
 Peter Tiehuis – guitar, piano
 Martijn Vink – drums
 Caroline Dest – backing vocals
 Lodewijk VanGorp – backing vocals
 Patrick Williams – arranger, producer
 Fred Williams – producer
 Al Schmitt – engineer, mixing

Charts

Weekly charts

Year-end charts

References

2006 albums
Blue Note Records albums
Trijntje Oosterhuis albums